The 2018 Overwatch League Grand Finals was the first championship series of the Overwatch League (OWL), which took place July 27–28, 2018. The series was the conclusion of the 2018 Overwatch League playoffs and was played between the London Spitfire and the Philadelphia Fusion at the Barclays Center in Brooklyn, New York.

London qualified for the playoffs as the fifth seed and defeated the fourth-seeded Los Angeles Gladiators and second-seeded Los Angeles Valiant in the playoffs. Philadelphia qualified for the playoffs as the sixth seed and defeated the third-seeded Boston Uprising and top-seeded New York Excelsior in the playoffs.

London Spitfire defeated Philadelphia Fusion in the first and second matches by scores of 3–1 and 3–0, respectively, to claim the title of Overwatch League Grand Finals Champions before a two-day attendance of 22,434 spectators.

Road to the Grand Finals 
The Grand Finals are the post-season championship series of the Overwatch League (OWL), a professional international esports league; the teams of the Grand Finals compete for a $1.4 million prize pool, where the winners receive $1 million. 2018 season was the first in OWL history and consisted of twelve teams in two divisions. Each team played 40 matches throughout the regular season. The playoffs were contested by six team – the two teams with the best regular season record in each division and the following four teams with the best regular season record, regardless of division.

The teams faced each other five times throughout the 2018 season, with one of those match-ups being the Stage 2 Semifinals – a game in which Philadelphia won. Overall, Philadelphia had beaten London in three out of their five match-ups.

London Spitfire 

Cloud9 was awarded the London slot for an OWL franchise on August 10, 2017, and was later named the London Spitfire. Shortly afterwards, they disclosed their 12-player inaugural season roster, the maximum permitted, which would be entirely composed of South Korean players. The roster would mainly be an amalgamation of their current Cloud9 KONGDOO core and OGN's Overwatch APEX Season 4 champions GC Busan.

London started the season with a win to the a 3–1 victory over the Florida Mayhem and continued that winning trend through their first five games, resulting in the team's best win streak of the 2018 regular season. On March 7, the Spitfire parted ways with head coach Lee "Bishop" Beom-joon for undisclosed reasons; Bishop had led the team to a 10–4 record until his departure. Struggling as the season went on, the Spitfire had to bank on their earlier results to edge them over the finish line. They ended the season with a  record, good for 5th place and a spot in the postseason where they faced the 4th-seeded Los Angeles Gladiators.

London lost their first postseason matchup against the Gladiators on July 11 by a score of 0–3 in the quarterfinals. The Spitfire turned it around the next two games against the Gladiators, winning in 3–0 sweeps in matches two and three and advancing the team to the semifinals. London won both games against the Los Angeles Valiant in the semifinals, winning 3–0 in match one and 3–1 in match two.

Philadelphia Fusion 

On September 20, 2017, Overwatch developer Activision Blizzard officially announced that Philadelphia Flyers owner Comcast Spectacor had acquired the rights to the Philadelphia-based Overwatch League franchise; later the team name was revealed as the Philadelphia Fusion. Shortly afterwards on November 3, their roster was revealed.

Philadelphia's season began with a 3–2 victory against the Houston Outlaws. While Philadelphia did upset the undefeated New York Excelsior in Stage 1, which marked New York's first lost in the regular season, the team had, overall, an inconsistent season. Philadelphia claimed the sixth, and final, seed of the playoffs on June 15.

Fusion defeated third-seeded Boston Uprising in the Quarterfinals by two matches to one. The team went on to face the top-seeded New York Excelsior in the Semifinals, a game the Fusion were considered heavy underdogs. Philadelphia dominated New York in the first match, winning three maps to zero, and took the second match by three maps to two.

Summary of results

Venue and ticketing 

The Barclays Center in New York was selected as the 2018 OWL Grand Finals host venue on May 9, 2018. Overwatch League commissioner Nate Nanzer noted that the league chose the venue due to its location in a major global city and its world-class status. Opened in 2012, the $1 billion stadium has a capacity of about 19,000 and is used by the Brooklyn Nets of the National Basketball Association (NBA) and the New York Islanders of the National Hockey League (NHL). The arena has also hosted concerts, conventions and other sporting and entertainment events, including the 2013 NBA Draft, the 2015 NBA All-Star Weekend, the 2016 NCAA Men's Division I Basketball Tournament, UFC 223, and the 2013 MTV Video Music Awards.

Ticket sales for the finals began on May 18, 2018. Two-day general admission tickets sold for $60, with "Master" and "Grandmaster" upgrade packages available for an additional $40 and $75, respectively. The package upgrades included extra access to fans, including photos, meet-and-greets, and Overwatch League "swag". The Grandmaster packages sold out after few hours of being on sale, leaving only general admission and master package upgrades available. The remaining tickets for the event sold-out exactly two weeks later, leaving resell tickets in excess of $125.

Broadcast and viewership 
On the first day of the season playoffs, Disney and Blizzard announced a multi-year partnership that would bring the league and other professional Overwatch competitive events to ESPN, Disney XD, and ABC, starting with the playoffs and throughout all of the following season. The partnership marked the time that a live esports competition had aired on ESPN in prime time and the first time that an esports competition had aired on ABC. Nielsen ratings for the Grand Finals include a 0.18 rating (approximately 218,000 households) for the Friday match airing on ESPN, while the recap of the series airing on ABC on the Sunday after the event had a 0.3 rating (approximately 359,000 households). Blizzard estimated that over a million people were watching the Grand Finals at any time, between broadcast and streaming formats, with a total viewership of over 10.8 million.

Entertainment 
Speed-painter David Garibaldi created his own take on the Overwatch League logo during a performance on July 27; the art piece was given away to a fan. DJ Envy performed during breaks on July 28, and opened for DJ Khaled.

On July 25, 2018, the Overwatch League announced that the Grand Finals would be opening with a live performance from DJ Khaled. The decision to choose the artist was negatively received by many, as DJ Khaled had been under fire for sexist remarks he had made in a recent interview. He performed live at the Barclays Center on July 28, prior to the first match of the second day. The performance was streamed live exclusively on Twitch. The performance was deemed by many to be underwhelming and awkward, as the audience often did not react to his attempts at livening the crowd and left voids of silence when the artist attempted to get them to sing the verses to his songs. Tatjana Vejnovic of Overwatch Wire described the performance as "the worst one [she's] ever witnessed... the performance should be categorized as a disaster."

Match summaries

Match one

Map 1: Dorado 

The first map of the match was escort map Dorado – a map that Philadelphia had a just-under 70 percent win rate in the regular season. Philadelphia was the first to attack and claimed all three points; London was able to effectively attack the first two points of Dorado, but after a nearly five-minute hold by Fusion, they were denied a third, giving Fusion the map win.

Map 2: Oasis 

With the help of a 7.5  ratio by Lee "Carpe" Jae-hyeok Widowmaker in second map of the night, control map Oasis, London was able to quickly even the score, as the team won the map 2–0.

Map 3: Eichenwalde 

Coming out of the half-time break and into the third map of the night, hybrid map Eichenwalde, Fusion subbed-in tank player Gael "Poko" Gouzerch for Isaac "Boombox" Charles, and was able to take the first point before being held. London was able to push the payload further than Fusion and secured a win for the third map.

Map 4: Volskaya Industries 

The fourth, and final, map of the night was assault map Volskaya Industries. Philadelphia started out on attack, and while they were able to secure the first point, they only able to claim 57 percent of the second point. After London claimed their own the first point, Park "Profit" Jun-young came up big, securing five final blows in the final 93 seconds to lead the Spitfire to a victory.

Match two

Map 1: Junkertown 

Escort map Junkertown was the first map of the night, and Philadelphia was the first to attack. Fusion was able to secure two points of the map, but a well-timed halt by Jae-Hui "Gesture" Hong's Orisa followed by a Dragonstrike by Jun-Young “Profit” Park's Hanzo lead to four kill with under two minutes remaining, held Fusion short of capping the third. London's attack went relatively smoothly, as the team was able to escort the payload further and claim map one.

Map 2: Lijiang Tower 

London dominated Philadelphia on the first point of the second map, control map Lijang Tower. While the second point proved to be slightly more difficult, London was able secure a 2–0 victory.

Map 3: King's Row 

The third, and final, map of the day was hybrid map King's Row. Fusion was able to finish all three points of the map, however, they completed it in overtime. London was also able to complete the map, but they still had a time-bank of 1:10 remaining. Since both teams earned three points on their respective attacks, the game went into time-bank rounds. Because Spitfire had over a minute left and Fusion was in overtime, by rule, only Spitfire was able to attempt an attack, meaning the best Fusion could hope for was a draw for the map. London felt little resistance, capping the first tick of point A, and secured the title of Grand Finals Champions.

Team rosters

Philadelphia Fusion

London Spitfire

References

External links 

Overwatch League Official Website

Overwatch
Grand
Overwatch League
London Spitfire
Philadelphia Fusion